The 1979 Grand Prix motorcycle racing season was the 31st F.I.M. Road Racing World Championship season.

Season summary
A season of changing fortunes in the 500cc class saw American, Kenny Roberts capture his second crown in the face of the Suzuki-mounted opposition. In the 50cc class, Eugenio Lazzarini won every race in which he finished to take the championship. Angel Nieto dominated on a Minarelli to take his seventh world championship. Kork Ballington would repeat as double world champion in the 250cc and 350cc classes for Kawasaki.

Defending champion Roberts was injured in a pre-season test but came back to win round two in impressive fashion. His rivals also suffered from bad luck. Hartog breaking his arm in practice, Cecotto badly breaking his kneecap in Austria and Sheene suffering from mechanical failures. The 1979 British Grand Prix would be remembered as one of the greatest races of the modern era with Roberts beating Sheene to the finish line by three-hundredths of a second.

After an eleven-year absence from world championship racing, Honda returned to competition with the exotic, four-stroke NR500 ridden by riders Mick Grant and Takazumi Katayama at the British Grand Prix. The motorcycle featured an engine with oval-shaped cylinders as well as a monocoque chassis. Both bikes retired from the race, Grant crashing out on the first turn after the bike spilled oil onto his rear tire. Katayama retired on the seventh lap due to ignition problems.

The top riders boycotted the Belgian Grand Prix over safety issues showing their increasing dissatisfaction with the way the FIM conducted races. After several safety issues, the top riders banded together near the end of the year to announce that they would create a competing championship called the World Series. Although the series never got off the ground, the riders had flexed their political muscles and it forced the FIM to change the way they dealt with races and the riders themselves. The FIM announced an increase in prize money for the following year. This would mark the beginning of an era of increased professionalism in the sport.

1979 Grand Prix season calendar

Final standings

500cc standings

350cc standings

250cc standings

125cc standings

50cc standings

Notes

References
 Büla, Maurice & Schertenleib, Jean-Claude (2001). Continental Circus 1949-2000. Chronosports S.A. 

Grand Prix motorcycle racing seasons
Grand Prix motorcycle racing season